

References

Villages in Pudukkottai district